Sorcerers Safari Magic Camp is a performance arts camp dedicated to teaching the art of magic to young people.

History

Sorcerer's Safari is the creation of Torontonian Mike Segal, who has worked as a magician since high school.

In 1996, the program started with only a small number of day campers only. In 1997, ten magic enthusiasts joined Segal and his wife and staff at Camp Tamarack.

The camp's student body includes youths from Japan, South Africa, Belgium, France and England to be taught by  professional magicians.

The camp became part of the Ontario Camping Association (OCA) in 2004.

Classes

Performance related activities found at magic camp include, card magic class, coin magic class, balloon twisting, linking rings, and juggling. Other activities include the Stage workshops.

There are also classes in marketing, restaurant magic and stage performance.

Staff/guests

Each year notable magicians and performers come to visit and teach at Sorcerers Safari Magic Camp. Some of these people include Lee Asher, Aaron Fisher, Soma, Eric Jones, Eric Buss, Nathan Kranzo, Oscar Munoz, Wayne Houchin, Dan & Dave Buck, Steve Valentine, Justin Flom, Suzanne, Daniel Garcia, Asi Wind, Michael Ammar, Shawn Farquhar and Greg Frewin.

Notes

External links
Sorcerers Safari Magic Camp official web site
Youtube video page
2007 Magic Camp Article
Sorcerers Safari Flickr photo page
Magic Camp Lip Dub
Magic Camp Documentary

Magic organizations
Youth organizations based in Canada
Educational organizations based in Ontario